The 2002 UEFA Women's Cup Final was a football match that took place on 23 May 2002 at the Waldstadion, Frankfurt between Umeå IK of Sweden and 1. FFC Frankfurt of Germany.

The match was the final of the 2001–02 UEFA Women's Cup, the first edition of the UEFA Women's Cup/Women's Champions League.

Frankfurt won the single leg final 2–0. It was the only final of the Women's Cup to not be contested over two legs.

The attendance of over 12,000 was claimed by UEFA as a European record for women's club football, ignoring the existence of earlier  reported women's club match attendances of up to 53,000.

Match

Details

External links
 2001–02 UEFA Women's Cup season at UEFA.com

References

Women's Cup
Uefa Women's Cup Final 2002
2002
UEFA
2001–02 in German women's football
May 2002 sports events in Europe
Sports competitions in Frankfurt
Football in Frankfurt
2000s in Frankfurt